Paul Idell Fiser (February 10, 1908 – June 25, 1978) was an American football coach. He was the head coach at Harding University in Searcy, Arkansas, for one season in 1931, compiling a record of 4–3, after which the school shut down the program until 1959.

The student body of Harding College was happily taken with their new coach in 1931, and wrote to him via the Harding yearbook, the Petit Jean:

Fiser played college football at Arkansas College (now known as Lyon College) in Batesville, Arkansas.

Fiser later taught at Arkansas Tech University in Russellville, Arkansas, where he served as a physical education instructor in the naval cadet program and was supervisor of the dining hall.

Head coaching record

College

References

1908 births
1978 deaths
Harding Bisons football coaches
Lyon Scots football players
High school football coaches in Arkansas
People from Shawnee, Oklahoma